Chen Duling (born 13 October 1993) is a Chinese actress. She is best known for her role in the coming-of-age film The Left Ear (2015) directed by Alec Su and Love In Flames of War (2022).

Filmography

Film

Television series

Documentary

Variety show

Discography

Awards and nominations

References

Living people
1993 births
Chinese film actresses
Chinese television actresses
21st-century Chinese actresses
Actresses from Fujian
Nanjing University of Aeronautics and Astronautics alumni
People from Xiamen